Philip Alexander Liggett  (born 11 August 1943) is an English commentator and journalist who covers professional cycling.

He currently commentates on the Tour de France and bike races for ITV and NBC Sports, and was previously associated with Australia's SBS. He is a former amateur cyclist and received a professional contract in 1967; instead of turning professional, he saw a future in sports journalism after writing articles in cycling magazines about races in which he participated.

Journalism 
Liggett initially wrote for Cycling magazine, and moved on to do freelance work for The Guardian, the Daily Telegraph and The Observer. In 1997, he was appointed Cycle Sport magazine's international editor. He has also written books on cycle racing.

Liggett has reported on 15 Olympic Games and 50 Tours de France, generally alongside fellow veteran cycling commentators and former cyclists Paul Sherwen (UK) and Bob Roll (US). Liggett has covered other sports including triathlons and ski jumping. Because of his varied assignments, Liggett has worked for all of the American Big Three networks: ABC, CBS, and NBC.

Liggett has also been associated with the Australian network SBS covering Australian events such as the Tour Down Under in addition to the Tour de France. In 2010, he covered Johannesburg's 94.7 Cycle Challenge for South Africa's SuperSport. Liggett also commentated for London 2012 with Australian broadcaster Foxtel. 

Anna Meares, Phil Liggett, and Robbie McEwen co-hosted the Seven Network broadcast of the 2023 Santos Men’s Tour Down Under used by  Peacock in the US.

Cycling 
Between 1972 and 1993, Liggett was technical director of the Milk Race. His involvement with organising cycle racing events led to his becoming vice-president of the Association Internationale Organisateurs des Courses Cycliste. In 1973, age 30, Liggett became the youngest ever UCI international commissaire.

Liggett has been president of the Cyclists' Touring Club (CTC), Britain's national cyclists' organisation.

In 2009, he was inducted into the British Cycling Hall of Fame.

Defence of Lance Armstrong 
Liggett was a long-time supporter of Lance Armstrong and was a regular speaker at "Livestrong" functions along with his Tour De France co-presenter Paul Sherwen. He repeatedly defended Armstrong, challenging the investigations which he called "a waste of money". When Floyd Landis tested positive at the 2006 Tour de France, Liggett denigrated the verdict saying "The fact that the lab knew whose sample it was testing is just one of the anomalies", but when Landis admitted to doping in 2010 and implicated Armstrong, Liggett dismissed it as "sour grapes" and called the accusations "ridiculous". He also stated that UCI President Pat McQuaid was "vehemently anti doping".

In 2012 after the United States Anti-Doping Agency (USADA) had stripped Armstrong of his Tour de France titles, Liggett claimed on South African Radio to have proof that unnamed politicians motivated by jealousy had fabricated the evidence against Armstrong by bribing witnesses. This provoked an angry response from USADA, who dismissed his claims, and a comprehensive, point by point, rebuttal by Michael Ashenden PhD, a leading doping expert. In October 2012, Liggett maintained his defence of Armstrong, calling the investigation a "witch hunt" without evidence. Later that month, in a documentary by ABC's Four Corners entitled "The World According to Lance", he stated that he now found it difficult to believe that Armstrong had never doped and that he was disappointed that Armstrong had lied to him in 2003 when asked about doping.

Personal life 
Liggett's home town is Bebington, Wirral, though he now lives in Bayford, Hertfordshire. He spends most of his leisure time in South Africa where he has a house in the Western Cape and a game farm near the Kruger National Park.

In 2005, Liggett was appointed a Member of the Order of the British Empire (MBE) for services to cycling.

Books 
 Tour De France for Dummies by Phil Liggett, James Raia, Sammarye Lewis and Lance Armstrong (27 May 2005)
 Tour de France 1988 by Phil Liggett (May 1988)
 Fastest Man on Wheels. In Pursuit of Chris Boardman by Phil Liggett (May 1994)
 Dancing on the Pedals: The Found Poetry of Phil Liggett, the Voice of Cycling by Phil Liggett and Doug Donaldson (Editor)

References

External links 

 Phil Liggett on Twitter
 Phil gets a birthday cake while on a cycle August 2009

1943 births
British sports broadcasters
Cycling announcers
Cycling journalists
Cycling writers
English male cyclists
English male journalists
English male non-fiction writers
English sportswriters
Living people
Members of the Order of the British Empire
Olympic Games broadcasters
People from Bebington
Sports commentators
British sports journalists
Tour de France journalists